Norman Edward Gardner (16 December 1921 – 17 July 2004) was an Australian rules footballer who played with Footscray in the Victorian Football League (VFL).

Notes

External links 

1921 births
2004 deaths
Australian rules footballers from Victoria (Australia)
Western Bulldogs players
Yarraville Football Club players
People from Footscray, Victoria